Edward Hewitt Parker (7 November 1903 – 16 May 1929) was an Australian rules footballer who played with Melbourne in the Victorian Football League (VFL).

Parker was the son of prominent Richmond VFA footballer James Hewitt Parker (1872–1911) and Mary Ellen Mahon (1874–1958).

He lost both of his legs to a circular saw in a construction site accident at Mitta Junction in 1929 and died of his injuries at Albury District Hospital.

Notes

External links 

1903 births
Australian rules footballers from Melbourne
Melbourne Football Club players
Accidental deaths in New South Wales
Industrial accident deaths
1929 deaths
People from Richmond, Victoria